Gina Patrick is a fictional character from the British Channel 4 soap opera Hollyoaks, played by Dannielle Brent. She debuted on-screen during the episodes airing in 1997. Brent secured the role after originally auditioning for the role of Gina's sister Kate Patrick. Gina was initially a recurring character, though was promoted later to the regular cast. Brent felt that the role had given her good training, though decided to leave the serial after four years.

Gina is characterised as a tomboy who prefers casual clothing and has strong views on environmental issues. The character has been at the centre of a lesbian relationship with fellow character Emily Taylor. Brent said she was not made aware of the storyline until later in her tenure. She praised the storyline because it portrayed lesbians in a natural relationship. The storyline had a positive effect on the programme itself when it increased viewing interest. The relationship was also well received by columnists of the Daily Record.

Casting
Actress Danielle Brent secured the role in 1997. It was her first television role after she attended the Italia Conti Academy of Theatre Arts. Brent originally auditioned for the role of Kate Patrick, who Natasha Symms went on to play. Brent was originally signed to the serial on a recurring basis, though she was later promoted to the regular cast. Brent left the programme after four years of playing Gina. Brent said she had a great time in the serial and labelled the role as "the best training I could have wished for."

Character development
Gina was characterised as a "eco warrior". Her style of clothing was casual wear and hooded sweat shirts. Gina was originally described to Brent as being a tomboy who liked wearing combats. Gina also takes on "major roles" in college politics and is described as a "memorable" contributor to the serial's fictional magazine The Review.

Gina was involved in a storyline in which she came out as a lesbian. She later begins a relationship with Emily Taylor (Lorna Pegler). Producers did not inform either actress about the storyline to begin with, however, told them they had "saucy" plans for their characters. Brent said she was "fine" with the storyline when she found out. Pegler said she was happy that the storyline showed there is nothing "unnatural" about same sex relationships. Brent said she played their relationship like any other, featuring "the laughs, the rows and so on." Brent and Pegler planned their characters first kiss two months in advance, in order to find out the best way to "tackle" the plot. Gina and Emily have completely different personalities, though they "share a passion for animal welfare." The storyline proved successful with viewers and increased general interest for Hollyoaks. Though some viewers became so involved with the storyline, they assumed Brent and Pegler were in a relationship outside of their characters. When Gina comes out to her family, her brother Sol Patrick (Paul Danan) does not take the news well. Danan said Sol is angry and hurt and "feels she has kept her sexuality a secret from him for years."

Storylines
Gina arrives in the village with her family Sol, Kate and Jill Patrick (Lynda Rooke). Gina soon establishes herself to be different from the rest of her family who are loud and brash. Gina takes a keen interest in environmental issues and flaunts facial piercings. She studies hard at Hollyoaks Community College and decides to get involved in college politics. She applies for a job as the editor of college magazine The Review, pitching against her friend Emily. Though Ruth Osborne (Terri Dwyer) manages to ruin her chances. Gina begins to act wayward and suffers with her identity. When she goes missing, Sol and Jill go in search for her and are involved in a car accident.

Gina fends of the advances of Paul Millington, not wanting to hurt him she lets him down gently. Gina then raises the issue of her sexuality, after she begins a relationship with Emily. When she comes out Sol is upset that she did not tell him sooner. Gina manages to secure a position with the magazine. Jill is later diagnosed with a brain tumour and later dies. This affects Gina's relationship with Emily. They begin to fight more and they cannot manage to be in each other's company. Emily has an affair and Gina ends their relationship when she finds out the truth. She moves back in with her step-father Jack Osborne (Jimmy McKenna). Gina then begins to fail at college and quits. She moves to China to work in an orphanage, wanting to make her mother proud of her.

Reception
Brent was nominated for "Sexiest Female" at the 2001 British Soap Awards, for her portrayal. Merle Brown of the Daily Record has been critical of Gina. Initially enjoying her storylines, she grew tired of the character. She said that The Patrick family became a mess and said Hollyoaks was "unmissable" when Gina suffered an identity crisis. When Gina lost the college election because of her sexuality, Brown said that it was "not nice" but added that it was probably true. She later became annoyed that Gina and Emily began fighting. She branded the storyline as "nonsense" and questioned why they ever bothered to begin a relationship. She later said they "spend most of their life fighting" and jested that blokes would much prefer them to do it "naked in mud." By 2001, Brown could not stand to watch Gina any longer. She said she hoped she would leave with Sol or be murdered by pimp Steve. In the book The media : an introduction, Adam Briggs and Paul Cobley said that by 2001 homosexual relationships in soap opera were no longer a novelty. They said Gina and Emily's relationship was a notable example.

References

Hollyoaks characters
Fictional lesbians
Television characters introduced in 1997
Female characters in television
Fictional LGBT characters in television